Roads of Life is the twelfth studio album by American musician Bobby Womack. The album was released in 1979, by Arista Records. It was dedicated to his late son Truth Womack (January 27, 1978 – June 2, 1978). The album was Bobby Womack's only album for Arista Records. It received low ratings and reached number 55 on the Top Soul Albums charts.

Track listing

Personnel
Bobby Womack -  lead vocals, guitar
Cecil Womack, Howie McDonald, Jimmy Johnson, Larry Byrom, Reggie Young - guitar
Anthony Willis, Bob Wray, David Hood - bass
Eddie "Bongo" Brown, Jack Ashford, Jimmy "Bebop" Evans, Roger Hawkins - drums, percussion
Barry Beckett, Patrick Moten, Randy McCormick, Tim Henson - keyboards
Ben Cauley, Charles Rose, Harrison Calloway, Harvey Thompson, Ronnie Eades, Wayne Jackson - horns
Melissa Manchester - guest vocals on "The Roots in Me"
Pat Hodges, Denita James, Jessica Smith - backing vocals
Leon Ware - vocal arrangements

Charts

Singles

References

1979 albums
Bobby Womack albums
Albums produced by Bobby Womack
Arista Records albums